Thomas of Woodstock, 1st Duke of Gloucester (7 January 13558 or 9 September 1397) was the fifth surviving son and youngest child of King Edward III of England and Philippa of Hainault.

Early life
Thomas was born on 7 January 1355 at Woodstock Palace in Oxfordshire after two short-lived brothers, one of whom had also been baptised Thomas. He married Eleanor de Bohun in 1374, was given Pleshey Castle in Essex, and was appointed Constable of the Realm, a position previously held by the Bohuns. The younger sister of Woodstock's wife, Mary de Bohun, was subsequently married to Henry of Bolingbroke, Earl of Derby, who later became King Henry IV of England.

In 1377, at the age of 22, Woodstock was knighted and created Earl of Buckingham. On 22 June 1380 he became Earl of Essex in right of his wife. In 1385, he received the title Duke of Aumale, and at about the same time was created Duke of Gloucester.

Campaign in Brittany

Thomas of Woodstock was in command of a large campaign in northern France that followed the War of the Breton Succession of 1343–1364. The earlier conflict was marked by the efforts of John IV, Duke of Brittany to secure control of the Duchy of Brittany against his rival Charles of Blois. John was supported in this struggle by the armies of the Kingdom of England, whereas Charles was supported by the Kingdom of France. At the head of an English army, John prevailed after Charles was killed in battle in 1364, but the French continued to undermine his position, and he was later forced into exile in England.

John returned to Brittany in 1379, supported by Breton barons who feared the annexation of Brittany by France. An English army was sent under Woodstock to support his position. Due to concerns about the safety of a longer shipping route to Brittany itself, the army was ferried instead to the English continental stronghold of Calais in July 1380.

As Woodstock marched his 5,200 men east of Paris, they were confronted by the army of Philip the Bold, Duke of Burgundy, at Troyes, but the French had learned from the Battle of Crécy in 1346 and the Battle of Poitiers in 1356 not to offer a pitched battle to the English. Eventually, the two armies simply marched away. French defensive operations were then thrown into disarray by the death of King Charles V of France on 16 September 1380. Woodstock's chevauchée continued westwards largely unopposed, and in November 1380 he laid siege to Nantes and its vital bridge over the Loire towards Aquitaine. However, he found himself unable to form an effective stranglehold, and urgent plans were put in place for Sir Thomas Felton to bring 2,000 reinforcements from England. By January, though, it had become apparent that the Duke of Brittany was reconciled to the new French king Charles VI, and with the alliance collapsing and dysentery ravaging his men, Woodstock abandoned the siege.

Dispute with King Richard II
Returning to England early in 1381, Thomas of Woodstock found that his brother, John of Gaunt, had married his wife's sister, Mary de Bohun, to John's own son Henry. The relations between the brothers, hitherto somewhat strained, were not improved by this event; presumably, Thomas was hoping to retain possession of Mary's estates. Still, having taken part in crushing the Peasants' Revolt in 1381, Thomas became more friendly with John, and in 1385 was created duke of Gloucester. However, this mark of favour did not prevent him from taking up an attitude of hostility to his nephew, Richard II.

Thomas placed himself at the head of the party that was opposed to the royal advisers, Michael de la Pole, 1st Earl of Suffolk and Robert de Vere, Earl of Oxford, whose recent elevation to Duke of Ireland had aroused discontent. Supported by those who were indignant at the extravagance and incompetence, real or alleged, of the king, Thomas was soon in a position of authority. He forced the dismissal and impeachment of Suffolk; was a member of the commission appointed in 1386 to reform the kingdom and the royal household; and took up arms when Richard began proceedings against the commissioners. Having defeated de Vere at the Battle of Radcot Bridge in December 1387 the duke and his associates entered London to find the king powerless in their hands. Thomas, who had previously threatened his nephew with deposition, was only restrained from taking this extreme step by the influence of his colleagues; but, as the leader of the "Lords Appellant" in the "Merciless Parliament," which met in February 1388 and was packed with his supporters, he took revenge upon his enemies, which culminated in a successful rebellion in 1388 that significantly weakened the king's power.

Richard II quickly regained control and eventually, in 1397, managed to dispose of the Lords Appellant. By 1396, Thomas and Richard were again at odds over policy. In 1397, Thomas was arrested at his home by the king himself and was imprisoned in Calais to await trial for treason. During that time he was murdered, probably by a group of men led by Thomas de Mowbray, 1st Duke of Norfolk, and the knight Sir Nicholas Colfox, presumably on behalf of Richard II; parliament declared him guilty of treason and his estates forfeited. These events caused an outcry among the nobility of England that is considered by many to have added to Richard's unpopularity.

Thomas was buried in Westminster Abbey, first in the Chapel of Saint Edmund and Saint Thomas in October 1397, and two years later reburied in the Chapel of Saint Edward the Confessor. His wife was buried next to him.

Marriage and progeny
Thomas married Eleanor de Bohun (c. 1366–1399), the elder daughter and co-heiress (with her sister Mary de Bohun) of Humphrey de Bohun, 7th Earl of Hereford (1341–1373). Thomas of Woodstock and his wife Eleanor had issue as follows:
Humphrey, 2nd Earl of Buckingham (c. 13811399), died aged 18, unmarried and without issue;
Anne of Gloucester (c. 13831438) who married three times:
Firstly to Thomas Stafford, 3rd Earl of Stafford, without issue;
Secondly to Edmund Stafford, 5th Earl of Stafford, the youngest brother of her first husband, by whom she had issue one son and two daughters; 
Thirdly to William Bourchier, 1st Count of Eu (1374–1420), by whom she had issue, represented today by the Wrey baronets (heirs of the Bourchier Earls of Bath), who quarter the arms of Bohun, Bourchier and Thomas of Woodstock.
Joan (1384–1400), who married Gilbert Talbot, 5th Lord Talbot (1383–1419) and died in childbirth
Isabel (12 March 1385/1386c.1421), a nun of the Order of Minoresses

As he was attainted as a traitor, his dukedom of Gloucester was forfeit. The title Earl of Buckingham was inherited by his son, who died in 1399 only two years after Thomas' own death. Thomas of Woodstock's eldest daughter, Anne, married into the powerful Stafford family, who were Earls of Stafford. Her son, Humphrey Stafford was created Duke of Buckingham in 1444 and also inherited part of the de Bohun estates.

The other part of these estatesincluding the Earldom of Hereford, which had belonged to Mary de Bohun and had then become incorporated into the holdings of the House of Lancasterbecame a matter of contention in the latter 15th century.

In literature

Thomas of Woodstock's murder plays a prominent part in William Shakespeare's play Richard II, though he is dead at the time of the play's beginning.
He also is the subject of Thomas of Woodstock, another Elizabethan drama by an anonymous playwright. Because of its stylistic affinities to Shakespeare's play, it is also called Richard the Second Part One.

Ancestry and family

Notes

References

External links
 Inquisition Post Mortem, #123–125.

Sources

 

 

1355 births
1397 deaths
14th-century English people
Lord High Constables of England
Thomas of Woodstock
Dukes of Gloucester
Thomas
01
Knights of the Garter
Male murder victims
People from Woodstock, Oxfordshire
Murdered royalty
Children of Edward III of England
Lords Lieutenant of Ireland
Sons of kings
Peers created by Edward III
Peers created by Richard II
Burials at Westminster Abbey